The International Documentary Film Festival Munich (Internationales Dokumentarfilmfestival München e.V. – DOK.fest München for short) has been held annually in Munich, Germany since 1985. Since 2001 it has been organised by the association Internationales Dokumentarfilmfestival München e.V. (International Documentary Film Festival Munich Association) together with the Filmstadt München association. The festival focuses on socially relevant and artistically valuable documentary films.

DOK.fest München also includes the industry platform and think tank DOK.forum, the educational programme DOK.education, the Student Award, the Africa focus DOK.network Africa, the year-round programme DOK.aroundtheclock as well as the festival in the region DOK.tour. The executive and artistic director is Daniel Sponsel, and the deputy director is Adele Kohout.

DOK.fest München is one of the largest documentary film festivals in Europe. In 2020, due to the COVID-19 pandemic, it was held exclusively online for the first time, with part of the proceeds benefiting the usually participating cinemas and a record attendance of more than 75,000 viewers. In 2021, the festival also moved into the digital space and presented 131 films from 43 countries, seen by over 71,000 viewers during the festival time in May. The 37th DOK.fest München 2022 was held as a dual festival for the first time.

History 
The founding of DOK.fest München goes back to the initiative of the Bavarian section of the Arbeitsgemeinschaft Dokumentarfilm / Documentary Film Association (AG DOK) Munich, which had set itself the goal of popularising documentary film and making it accessible to a broad audience. In cooperation with the Filmstadt München e.V., an association of local film initiatives, the 1st Munich International Documentary Film Festival was launched in 1985 with municipal support. Gudrun Geyer was appointed director and ran the festival until 2001.

Following the resignation of Gudrun Geyer in 2001, Hermann Barth took on the task of raising the festival's profile in Munich, Germany and worldwide on behalf of the newly founded association Internationales Dokumentarfilmfestival München e.V.  Since 2002, the festival has been operating under the brand name DOK.fest with an expanded programme.

In 2009 Hermann Barth stepped down and the new management was taken over by Daniel Sponsel with the initial executive support of Christian Pfeil. Sponsel relies on the proven successful concept of Germany's largest festival for long documentaries and expanded the programme to include the German-language competition DOK.deutsch, the guest series DOK.guest, the retrospective and DOK.education, the educational programme. He also launched the industry and young talent platform DOK.forum in 2011.

The COVID-19 pandemic forced a new conception of the festival as DOK.fest München @home. In the online edition, there were daily award ceremonies, events and live online discussions with filmmakers in addition to the documentary films on the digital screen. The industry platform DOK.forum also moved the planned workshops, pitches and discussion rounds into the digital space. For school classes, the educational programme DOK.education offered free viewing links with teaching units for three age levels. In 2021, the second online edition of the festival took place and in 2022 the first dual version: from 4 to 15 May 2022 at the Munich venues and with a time delay from 9 to 22 May 2022 online.

Series and awards 
The festival programme of DOK.fest München is divided into competitions, thematic series and specials. A selection of current international documentaries with a length of 52 minutes or more will be shown. For the competition sections, special consideration is given to premieres. In 2022, the 17 prizes of the festival were endowed with prize money and provisions totalling 66,300 euros. The VIKTOR is awarded within the framework of the three main competitions. The VIKTOR DOK.international is the festival's main prize.

VIKTOR DOK.international – International Competition 
 2011: Der Fall Chodorkowski – Cyril Tuschi
 2012: Six Million and One – David Fisher
 2013: Sur le rivage du monde – Sylvain L' Espérance
 2014: See No Evil – Jos de Putter
 2015: Something Better to Come – Hanna Polak
 2016: Natural Disorder – Christian Sønderby Jepsen
 2017: Nowhere To Hide – Zaradasht Ahmed
 2018: The Distant Barking of Dogs – Simon Lereng Wilmont
 2019: Der nackte König – 18 Fragmente über Revolution – Andreas Hoessli
 2020: Acasă, My Home – Radu Ciorniciuc
2021: Anny – Helena Třeštíková
2022: Trenches – Loup Bureau

VIKTOR DOK.deutsch – German-speaking Competition 
 2011: Wadans Welt – Dieter Schumann
 2012: Das schlechte Feld – Bernhard Sallmann
 2013: Der Imker – Mano Khalil
 2014: Nirgendland – Helen Simon
 2015: Aus dem Abseits – Simon Brückner
 2016: Holz Erde Fleisch – Sigmund Steiner
 2017: Bruder Jakob – Elí Roland Sachs
 2018: I'm a bad guy – Susanne Freund
 2019: Die bauliche Maßnahme – Nikolaus Geyrhalter
 2020: Weiyena – Ein Heimatfilm – Weina Zhao and Judith Benedikt
2021: Zuhurs Töchter – Laurentia Genske and Robin Humboldt
2022: Zusammenleben – Thomas Fürhapter

VIKTOR DOK.horizonte 
 2011: El Mocito – Marcela Said
 2012: Bachelor Mountain – Yu Guangyi
 2013: A World not Ours – Mahdi Fleifel
 2014: Cantos – Charlie Petersmann
 2015: Ce qu'il reste de la folie – Joris Lachaise
 2016: A Maid For Each – Maher Abi Samra
 2017: Motherland – Ramona S. Díaz
 2018: Demons in Paradise – Jude Ratnam
 2019: Está todo bien – Alles ist gut – Tuki Jencquel
 2020: They call me Babu – Sandra Beerends
2021: Things we dare not to – Bruno Santamaria
2022:  No simple way home – Akuol de Mabior

megaherz Student Award (until 2016: megaherz Filmschulpreis) 
 2015: If Mama ain't Happy, Nobody is Happy – Mae de Jong
 2016: La Fin d'Homère – Zahra Vargas
 2017: Per Song – Shuchang Xie
 2018: Sand und Blut – Matthias Krepp and Angelika Spangel
 2019: In Search... – Beryl Magoko
 2020: Regeln am Band, bei hoher Geschwindigkeit – Yulia Lokshina
2021: The Case You – Alison Kuhn
2022: Pushing Boundaries – Lesia Kordonets

FFF Talent Award Documentary Film 

 2011: El Bulli – Cooking in progress – Gereon Wetzel
 2012: Schnee – August Pflugfelder
 2013: Der Kapitän und sein Pirat – Andy Wolff
 2014: Im Schatten der Copacabana – Denize Galiao
 2015: Mission Control Texas – Ralf Bücheler
 2016: Europe, She Loves – Jan Gassmann
 2017: Salicelle Rap – Carmen Té
 2018: Früher oder später – Pauline Roenneberg
 2019: Congo Calling – Stephan Hilpert
 2020: Chaddr – Unter uns der Fluss – Minsu Park
 2021: Väter Unser – Sophie Linnenbaum
 2022: Hoamweh Lung – Felix Klee

Documentary Film Award by Goethe-Institut 

 2022: Liebe, D-Mark und Tod – Cem Kaya

ARRI AMIRA Award 

 2016: Tempestad – camera: Ernesto Pardo, direction: Tatiana Huezo
 2017: Cameraperson – camera and directing: Kirsten Johnson
 2018: Caniba – camera and directing: Véréna Paravel and Lucien Castaing-Taylor
 2019: Rediscovery – camera: Phie Ambo and Maggie Olkuska, direction: Phie Ambo

Since 2020, the prize has no longer been awarded.

DOK.fest Award of SOS Kinderdörfer weltweit 
 2014: Neuland – Anna Thommen
 2015: Toto and His Sisters – Alexander Nanau
 2016: Sonita – Rokhsareh Ghaem Maghami
 2017: Komunia – Anna Zamecka
 2018: The Distant Barking of Dogs – Simon Lereng Wilmont
 2019: Bruce Lee & The Outlaw – Joost Vandebrug
 2020: Copper Notes of a Dream – Reza Farahmand
2021: School of Hope – Mohamed El Aboudi
2022: Children of the Mist – Ha Le Diem

kinokino Audience Award sponsored by 3sat and Bayerischer Rundfunk 
 2015: Electroboy – Marcel Gisler
 2016: Parchim International – Stefan Eberlein and Manuel Fenn
 2017: Miss Kiet's Children – Petra Lataster-Czisch and Peter Lataster
 2018: Tackling Life – Johannes List
 2019: Another Reality – Noël Dernesch and Oliver Waldhauer
 2020: The Euphoria Of Being – Réka Szabó
2021: He's My Brother – Cille Hannibal and Christine Hanberg
2022: Girl Gang – Susanne Regina Meures

German Documentary Film Music Award 
 2015: Above and Below – composition: Paradox Paradise (John Gürtler, Jan Miserre and Lars Voges), director: Nicolas Steiner
 2016: Dreams Rewired – composition: Siegfried Friedrich, directors: Manu Luksch, Martin Reinhart and Thomas Tode
 2017: 6 Jahre, 7 Monate und 16 Tage – Die Morde des NSU – composition: Elias Gottstein, director: Sobo Swobodnik
 2018: Beuys – composition: Damian Scholl and Ulrich Reuter, director: Andres Veiel
 2019: Stress – music: Jana Irmert, director: Florian Baron
 2020: Die letzten Österreicher – music: Klemens Bittmann, Christian Bakanic and Christofer Frank
2021: Soldaten – music: Christoph Schauer
2022: Mein gestohlenes Land – composition: Carsten Nicolai aka Alva Noto, director: Marc Wiese

German Composition Funding Award 

 2016: Stray Dogs – composition: John Gürtler, direction: Elsa Kremser and Levin Peter
 2017: Die Geheimnisse des Schönen Leo – composition: Alex Maschke, direction: Benedikt Schwarzer
 2018: Go back! – composition: Florian Erlbeck
 2019: Mau Ke Mana – Or: Where Are You Going? – composition: Max Gausepohl, direction: Max Sänger
 2020: Awalatje – Die Hebammen – Anna-Marlene Bicking, Sarah Noa Bozenhardt and Sonja Kilbertus
 2021: May It Be A Girl – composition: Akmaral Zykayeva, direction: Katerina Suvorova, production: Viktoriya Kalashnikova
 2022: I don't want to be just a memory – composition: Bráulio Bandeira, Kei Watanabe, direction: Sarnt Utamachote, production: Klaus Salminen

VFF Documentary Film Production Award 
 2018: Grenzenlos – Geschichten von Freiheit und Freundschaft – producer: Birgit Schulz (Bildersturm Filmproduktion), directors: Johanna Bentz, Camilo Colmenares, Sandra Dajani, Madeleine Dallmeyer, Nazgol Emami, Diana Menestrey, Khaled Nawal and Birgit Schulz
 2019: Boy Of War – producer: Fabian Driehorst (Fabian&Fred), director: Cyprien Clément-Delmas and Igor Kosenko
 2020: Jenseits des Sichtbaren – Hilma af Klint – producers: Eva Illmer (Ambrosia Film GmbH) and Halina Dyrschka (also director)
 2021: The Other Side Of The River – producers: Frank Müller (Doppelplusultra Filmproduktion), Guevara Namer and Antonia Kilian (Pink Shadow Films), direction: Antonia Kilian
 2022: 1001 Nights Apart – production: Sarvnaz Alambeigi (Rabison Art Production), Stefan Tolz and Thomas Riedelsheimer (Filmpunkt GmbH) and Louise Rosen (Louise Rosen Ltd.), direction: Sarvnaz Alambeigi

Award of the Subtitle Workshop Münster (OmU Promotion Award) 

 2008: Comeback – Maximilian Plettau
 2009: Bernsteinland – Ein Todesmarsch in Ostpreußen – Julia Bourgett
 2013: Meine keine Familie – Paul-Julien Robert
 2014: Das Leben nach dem Tod am Meer – Martin Rieck
 2015: Nicht alles schlucken – Jana Kalms, Piet Stolz and Sebastian Winkels
 2016: Fragmente meiner Mutter – Britta Schöning

Since 2017, the prize has no longer been awarded.

Retrospective 
 2011: Klaus Wildenhahn
 2012: Wim Wenders
 2013: Werner Herzog
 2014: Kim Longinotto
 2015: Avi Mograbi
 2016: Andres Veiel
 2017: Georg Stefan Troller
 2018: Helga Reidemeister
 2019: Heddy Honigmann
2021: 75 Jahre DEFA-Dokumentarfilm
2022: Years of dictatorship under Francisco Franco

Homage 

 2021: Helena Třeštíková
 2022: Heidi Specogna

DOK.edit Award – presented by Adobe 

 2021: Nemesis – editors: Thomas Imbach and David Charap, direction: Thomas Imbach
 2022: Daughters – editors: Åsa Mossberg and Line Schou, direction: Jenifer Malmqvist

DOK.talent Award of Haus des Dokumentarfilms (formerly Pitch Award of Haus des Dokumentarfilms) 
 2015: Aliyah – Rafael Bondy
 2016: My Jewrovision – Walter Solon
 2017: Awalatje – Die Hebammen – Sarah Noa Bozenhardt
 2018: Merci de votre visite – Julia Furer
 2019: Chagrin Valley – Nathalie Berger
 2020: After the Gods – Jasmine Alakari
 2021: Der siebte Sohn – Max Carlo Kohal
 2022: Von Pflanzen und Menschen – Antshi von Moos

British Pathé Archive Award 

 2019: Wenn der Nebel sich lichtet – direction: Nancy Brandt, production: Ralf Kukula
 2020: Queen Of Chess – Bernadett Tuza-Ritter, Gabor Harmi, Lili Kovacs
 2021: Life Is Not A Competition But I'm Winning – direction: Julia Fuhr Mann
 2022: I Used To Be The Mayor – Alexander Sussmann (direction), Karoline Henkel (co-production)

DOK.series Award 

 2021: Un Pedazo de Paz – direction: Jacobo Albán and Carlos Zerpa, production: Carlos Zerpa and Benoît Ayraud
 2022: Memory Wars – Hendrik Löbbert (direction), Erik Winker and Daniela Dieterich (production)

DOK.digital – Award for new narrative formats 

 2020: Social Score – Vinzenz Aubry, Sebastian Strobel, Ralph Tharayil and Fabian Burghardt (Sansho Studio)
 2021: Safespace – Whitney Bursch, Säli El Mohands, Rosa Fabry, Saphira Siegmund, Lea Wessels, Ariane Böhm, Elena Münker and Kim Neubauer
 2022: Sneakerjagd – Benedikt Dietsch and Lorenz Jeric

FairFilmAward Non-Fiction 

 2018: Florianfilm
 2019: ifage Filmproduktion

Since 2020, the prize has no longer been awarded.

DOK.education Documentary Film Award for Young People sponsored by BLLV e.V. 

 2015: 1. prize Eine andere Zeit – Verena Wagner, 2. prize Von einem, der auszog – Filmgruppe algo, 3. prize Sophia 2013 – Lilian Robl
 2016: 1. prize Utopie der Unterschiede – Laura Kansy, Viktor Schimpf and Annika Sehn, 2. prize A Man's Road – Jonathan Gentz and Victor Sattler, 3. prize Musik als Zuflucht – Moritz Spender
 2017: 1. prize Tell Me Mr. Lo – Maya Duftschmid, 2. prize Wo Leben anders ist – Theresa Setzer, 3. prize Mein Shirt – Mathis Hauter (with Leon Schreiner, Paul Schober and Eva Böhm)
 2018: 1. prize Vielleicht – Filmgruppe algo, state BSZ Alfons Goppel Schweinfurt, 2. prize Billy zieht um – Daniel Aberl, 3. prize Anders sehen – Film Group of the Goethe Gymnasium Regensburg, special mention: Dem Gewissen folgen – Amelie and Moritz Geiger
 2019: 1. prize Nana – Recover Your Smile – Sabine Nering, 2. prize 3004 KM – Melisa Kocak, 3. prize Pepitu Anumu – Rebecca Fischer, Susanne Horban, Isabelle Sohling and Ines Zehetmeier
 2020: 1. prize Ben – vom Leben erzählen – Armin-Knab-Gymnasium Kitzingen, 2. prize Die alte Gärtnerei – Stephanie Schaible, Anita-Augspurg-Berufsoberschule München, 3. prize Hummelsteiner Weg – Hummelsteiner Weg Mittelschule, 1. prize for 6- to 11-year-olds Mit Lotte durch München – Charlotte Knorr, documentary advancement award for 6- to 11-year-olds Unser Leben im Moment – Flora Weber
 2021: 1. prize Ausnahmezustand – Film Groupe Antonia-Werr-Zentrum St. Ludwig, 2. prize Nicht aus dem Bilderbuch – Natalie Kurzweg, Anita-Augspurg-Berufsoberschule München, 3. prize Die Liebe einer Mutter – Leonie Ehrmüller, Anita-Augspurg-BOS, 1. prize for 6- to 11-year-olds Snowboarden ist mein Leben – Flora Weber, documentary advancement award Umweltsünden – Hummelsteiner Weg Mittelschule, special mention Die kleinen Dinge – Louisa von Schnurbein
 2022: 1. prize Alt, Älter, Arm by Sara-Gina Grünwald, Städtische Anita-Augspurg Berufsoberschule München, 2. prize Imaginärer Freund by Aimée Vollmer, Gymnasium Trudering, 3. prize Ich zähle by Louis Höllenreiner, Städtische Anita-Augspurg Berufsoberschule München, DOK.fest Young Talent Award Zhao und die Brücke zur Gesellschaft by Noah Terschak, Jonas Scheuerer and Jennifer Meyer, Clermont-Ferrand Mittelschule Regensburg, Main prize for 6- to 11-year-olds Traumberuf Lehrerin!? by Charlotte Knorr, special mention Born Identity by Jasmin Sossou, Städtische Anita-Augspurg Berufsoberschule München

DOK.education – educational programme 

The film literacy section DOK.education started in 2011 as the youth section of DOK.fest München and was aimed at a young audience aged 8 to 18. In 2013, filmmaker Maya Reichert took over the management and reorientation. The programme was expanded into a year-round pedagogical programme due to the increased focus on adult education in 2018. The aim of the programme is film education, media literacy and cultural education at the extracurricular learning venue of the cinema, in the classroom and, since 2020, online.

For schools 
The "School of Seeing" (formerly: Documentary Film School) for school classes offers film screenings accompanied by media education and discussions with filmmakers. The focus is on short professional documentaries from the lives of children and young people. In the School of Seeing, participants learn to differentiate how they see films and are motivated to apply this to their own everyday media use in order to become critical and self-confident media users. For each curated film, a team of film experts creates accompanying school material for teachers. The programme went online in 2020 due to the pandemic and expanded its user base nationwide. In 2021, three online cinema rooms with 12 digital lessons for distance learning and classroom use were available to school classes.

For teachers, DOK.education offers year-round media education training in cooperation with certifying training academies.

With the European film education platform LEARNING BY DOCS young people experience European reality of life in the 20th century through documentary films. Together with two European documentary film festivals, DOK.education supports film and European education in the classroom across national borders.

For young people 
In the year-round educational programme, practical workshops for children, young people, film groups and school classes are offered throughout Bavaria in a face-to-face setting and also online since 2020 in order to learn how to make films or read film as an artistic medium.

DOK.education has awarded annual prizes in the Bavaria-wide youth film competition for documentary films by children, adolescents and young adults since 2015 with the aim of encouraging practical filmmaking and artistic expression in the documentary genre.

The label DOK.4teens identifies films in the festival programme that are officially released for audiences aged 14 and over. For the regular programme the usual age rating of 18 and over applies.

DOK.forum – industry platform 

DOK.forum sees itself as a think tank for the documentary film industry and as a platform for projects in the development process. Since 2011 DOK.forum has taken place at the Hochschule für Fernsehen und Film München and in recent years has established itself as a permanent meeting place for the German-speaking industry – with a growing range of offerings for international filmmakers. In 2020, the industry programme took place exclusively online. The programme is divided into two segments:

Public events: DOK.forum Perspectives 

In panel discussions, workshops and case studies, the DOK.forum Perspectives take a look at the developments in documentary work and invite you to develop visions and impulses and explore relevant media policy issues. The public events are aimed both at the industry and the interested festival audience.

Coproduction and ideas market: DOK.forum Marketplace 

The marketplace offers filmmakers the opportunity to meet editors and producers from Germany, Austria, Switzerland and South Tyrol at moderated roundtables and present their concepts. The best student pitch concept is awarded the Pitch Award of Haus des Dokumentarfilms.

Virtual Reality Pop Up Cinema 

Since 2017, DOK.fest München has been presenting a selection of international documentary 360° and VR experiences parallel to the festival in May in the Futuro exhibition house in front of the Pinakothek der Moderne.

Cinemas and festival venues 

 Carl-Amery-Saal im Gasteig
 City Kinos
 Deutsches Theater
 Filmmuseum München
 Harry Klein (Club)
 Hochschule für Fernsehen und Film München (HFF)
 Instituto Cervantes München
 Katholische Akademie in Bayern
 Lenbachhaus
 Literaturhaus München
 Münchner Kammerspiele
 Museum Fünf Kontinente
 Neues Maxim
 NS-Dokumentationszentrum (München)
 Pinakothek der Moderne
 Rio Filmpalast

DOK.tour Bayern 

DOK.tour Bayern has been bringing selected films from the current festival year to the cinemas of the Bavarian region since 2011. In 2019 the DOK.tour toured 18 cities throughout Bavaria between October and December with five documentaries. In 2020, the DOK.tour took place on three weekends before Christmas with three films on the digital screen.

References

External links 
 DOK.fest München

Documentary film festivals in Germany
Mass media in Munich
Festivals in Munich